Events from the year 1692 in the Kingdom of Scotland.

Incumbents 
 Monarch – William II and Mary II
 Secretary of State – John Dalrymple, Master of Stair, with James Johnston (from 3 March)

Law officers 
 Lord Advocate – John Dalrymple, then Sir James Stewart
 Solicitor General for Scotland – ??

Judiciary 
 Lord President of the Court of Session – Lord Stair
 Lord Justice General – Lord Lothian
 Lord Justice Clerk – Lord Cessnock, then Lord Ormiston

Events 
 13 February – Massacre of Glencoe: Men of the Earl of Argyll's Regiment of Foot under the command of Captain Robert Campbell of Glenlyon massacre 38 Jacobite-sympathising MacDonald of Glencoe from whom they have previously accepted hospitality.

Births 
 May – James Stirling mathematician, (died 1770)
 25 May – Archibald Douglas, 2nd Earl of Forfar, peer, mortally wounded at the Battle of Sheriffmuir (died 1715)
 date unknown –
 Andrew Fletcher, Lord Milton, judge and Lord Justice Clerk (died 1776)
 George Young, surgeon, physician, philosopher and empiric (died 1757)

Deaths 
 20 March – George Douglas, 1st Earl of Dumbarton, nobleman and soldier (born 1635)
 2 April – Sir John Lauder, 1st Baronet, baillie and Treasurer of the City of Edinburgh (born 1595)
 14 May – Robert Kirk, minister, Gaelic scholar and folklorist (born 1644)
 3 August –
 Hugh Mackay, general, died at the Battle of Steenkerque (born c.1642)
 James Douglas, Earl of Angus, nobleman and soldier, died at the Battle of Steenkerque (born 1671)

See also 
 Timeline of Scottish history

References 

 
Years of the 17th century in Scotland
1690s in Scotland